IEEE Transactions on Communications is a monthly peer-reviewed scientific journal published by the IEEE Communications Society that focuses on all aspects of telecommunication technology, including telephone, telegraphy, facsimile, and point-to-point television by electromagnetic propagation. The editor-in-chief is Tolga M. Duman (Bilkent University). According to the Journal Citation Reports, the journal has a 2018 impact factor of 5.69.

History
The journal traces back to the establishment of the Transactions of the American Institute of Electrical Engineers in 1884. The journal has gone through several name changes and splits over the years.

1884–1951: Transactions of the American Institute of Electrical Engineers
1952–1963: Transactions of the American Institute of Electrical Engineers, Part I: Communication and Electronics
1953–1955: Transactions of the IRE Professional Group on Communications Systems
1956–1962: IRE Transactions on Communications Systems
1963–1964: IEEE Transactions on Communications Systems
1964: IEEE Transactions on Communication and Electronics
1964–1971: IEEE Transactions on Communication Technology
1972–present: IEEE Transactions on Communications

References

External links 
 

Engineering journals
Transactions on Communications
Monthly journals
Publications established in 1972
English-language journals